Lack Township is a township in Juniata County, Pennsylvania, United States. The population was 638 at the 2020 census. It was named by Irish settlers, most likely after Lack, County Fermanagh, although also possibly after Leck, of which there are a few places of that name in the Province of Ulster.

Geography
The township is within the Ridge and Valley province of the Appalachian Mountains. Blacklog Mountain forms the northwest border of the township, and Shade Mountain runs parallel to it,  to the southeast. Tuscarora Mountain forms the southeast border of the township. Tuscarora Creek, a northeast-flowing tributary of the Juniata River, runs through the largest valley in the township at the northwestern base of Tuscarora Mountain. Pennsylvania Route 75 traverses the Tuscarora Creek valley, leading northeast to Port Royal and southwest to the Pennsylvania Turnpike in Franklin County. Pennsylvania Route 35 runs in the same direction through a smaller valley at the southeast foot of Shade Mountain; the highway leads northeast to Mifflin and southwest to Shade Gap.

Lack Township occupies the southwestern end of Juniata County and is bordered by Mifflin County to the northwest, Tuscarora Township to the northeast, Perry and Franklin Counties to the southeast and Huntingdon County to the southwest. Unincorporated communities in the township include Blacklog and Krause in the valley between Blacklog Mountain and Shade Mountain, Cross Keys and Peru Mills along PA 35, and Spears Grove, Waterloo, and Perulack along PA 75. East Waterford, a census-designated place largely in Tuscarora Township, extends west into Lack Township along PA 75.

Demographics

As of the census of 2000, there were 750 people, 292 households, and 219 families residing in the township.  The population density was 13.2 people per square mile (5.1/km).  There were 570 housing units at an average density of 10.0/sq mi (3.9/km).  The racial makeup of the township was 99.07% White, 0.13% African American, and 0.80% from two or more races. Hispanic or Latino of any race were 0.27% of the population.

There were 292 households, out of which 27.4% had children under the age of 18 living with them, 61.6% were married couples living together, 4.5% had a female householder with no husband present, and 24.7% were non-families. 20.9% of all households were made up of individuals, and 11.3% had someone living alone who was 65 years of age or older.  The average household size was 2.57 and the average family size was 2.95.

In the township the population was spread out, with 23.2% under the age of 18, 8.7% from 18 to 24, 22.8% from 25 to 44, 29.3% from 45 to 64, and 16.0% who were 65 years of age or older.  The median age was 42 years. For every 100 females, there were 103.3 males.  For every 100 females age 18 and over, there were 111.8 males.

The median income for a household in the township was $29,565, and the median income for a family was $32,115. Males had a median income of $26,635 versus $19,063 for females. The per capita income for the township was $14,016.  About 9.0% of families and 14.9% of the population were below the poverty line, including 28.4% of those under age 18 and 7.9% of those age 65 or over.

References

Populated places established in 1754
Townships in Juniata County, Pennsylvania
Townships in Pennsylvania
1754 establishments in Pennsylvania